Patrick McGrath (died 20 June 1956) was an Irish Fianna Fáil politician. He represented Cork Borough as a Fianna Fáil Teachta Dála (TD) in Dáil Éireann between 1946 and 1956. Independent TD William Dwyer resigned his seat on 29 March 1946 and the subsequent by-election on 14 June 1946 was won by McGrath. He was re-elected at each general election until his death in office in 1956. The August 1956 by-election for his seat was won by John Galvin of Fianna Fáil.

He served as Lord Mayor of Cork between 1952 and 1956. In recognition of his active part in the Irish War of Independence, McGrath was made the chairman of the Cork City Old IRA Men's Association. 

In September 1953, he welcomed Laurel and Hardy at the city hall during their visit to Cork.

References

 

Year of birth missing
1956 deaths
Fianna Fáil TDs
Irish Republican Army (1919–1922) members
Lord Mayors of Cork
Members of the 12th Dáil
Members of the 13th Dáil
Members of the 14th Dáil
Members of the 15th Dáil